Barm-e Shur (also Romanized as Barm-e Shūr) is a village in Mishan Rural District, Mahvarmilani District, Mamasani County, Fars Province, Iran. At the 2006 census, its population was 21, in 5 families.

References 

Populated places in Mamasani County